Yahyaköy can refer to:

 Yahyaköy, Karayazı
 Yahyaköy, Susurluk